Dallas Liu is an American actor. Originally a martial artist, Liu made his acting debut as young Jin Kazama in Tekken (2009). He has gone on to appear in the television series PEN15 as Shuji Ishii-Peters and as Carter in Legendary Dudas. He will portray Prince Zuko in the upcoming Netflix live action remake series Avatar: The Last Airbender.

Early life 
Liu grew up in San Gabriel Valley, California. Liu practices Japanese Shotokan and competed in the North American Sport Karate Association. He began practicing martial arts when he was 5 years old and stopped competing internationally at 13 years old.

Career 
Liu made his film debut as young Jin Kazama on Tekken (2009). He was referred to the audition by one of his martial arts teachers. Liu's manager initially found him through karate videos uploaded onto YouTube. He had a recurring role as Carter on Nickelodeon's Legendary Dudas.

Liu played Maya Erskine's brother Shuji on the Hulu dramedy PEN15.

Liu played Taylor King in Snapchat's young-adult drama series, Players. Liu later appeared in the 2021 Marvel film, Shang-Chi and the Legend of the Ten Rings. He portrayed Ruihua, the younger brother of Awkwafina's Katy.

On September 26, 2020, Liu did a virtual reading of Seven Minutes in Heaven for the play's 10th anniversary.

On August 12, 2021, Netflix revealed that Liu was cast as Zuko in their live action television adaptation of Avatar: The Last Airbender.

Personal life 
Liu is of Chinese and Indonesian descent.

Filmography

Film

Television

References

External links 
 

Living people
Male actors from Los Angeles County, California
American actors of Chinese descent
American male child actors
American male film actors
American male television actors
American people of Chinese-Indonesian descent
Year of birth missing (living people)
Place of birth missing (living people)
21st-century American male actors